The Cizeta-Moroder V16T, now known as just the Cizeta V16T, is an Italian sports car (built from 1991 to 1995) developed by automotive engineer Claudio Zampolli in a joint venture with music composer Giorgio Moroder and designed by Marcello Gandini. It was the only product of the Cizeta company. It was developed by a group of ex-Lamborghini employees and initially introduced in Los Angeles in December 1988.

History 
The Cizeta-Moroder name comes from the Italian pronunciation of designer Claudio Zampolli's initials (CZ) (Ci-Zeta). Zampolli worked as a test and development engineer at Lamborghini before starting his own business of selling and maintaining high-performance sports cars. The V16T was conceived out of his desire to have his initials on a sports car. He made a partnership venture with his long time customer Giorgo Moroder, an Oscar winning music composer, who regularly came to his shop to have his Lamborghini Countach serviced after learning that the two shared similar interests in automobiles. Moroder was a 50% stakeholder in the new joint venture. Zampolli selected a team of former Lamborghini employees to develop the car which included Oliviero Pedrazzi as the chief engineer and engine designer and Achille Bevini along with Ianose Bronzatti as in-charge of the suspension and the chassis. Giancarlo Guerra, a former craftsman of Scaglietti body works who was infamous for coach-making the body of the Ferrari 250 GTO along with devising economical ways to make the chassis of the Lamborghini Countach when he worked at Lamborghini, was tasked to build the body of the car for the initial production run.

Technical details 

The V16T signifies that its engine is a 16-cylinder engine having the two banks of cylinders arranged in a V configuration and mounted transversely in the central rear position, just forward of the rear axle and behind the passenger seats. It shares a single aluminum cylinder block, with four cylinder heads with gearing between themselves, providing a single output from the center of the engine assembly to the five-speed transaxle. The engine is based on the Lamborghini Urraco's 90° DOHC flat-plane V8 with which it shares a number of parts including the separate heads. The central output also allowed chief engineer Oliviero Pedrazzi to retain the Urraco's crankshaft(s). The Bosch K-Jetronic fuel injection systems from the V8 engines were retained for supplying fuel to the engine. The resulting engine has 64 valves, eight overhead camshafts (instead of the conventional long four camshafts) and has a capacity of  having a compression ratio of 9.3 to 1. The decision to use a V16 engine was taken to make the car unique and due to Zampolli's fascination of large automobiles.

At the front, the V16T has unequal-length control arms connected to specially designed light-alloy upright joints. The spring-damper units developed by Koni are attached to the control arms conventionally; the suspension arms, connected by an adjustable anti-roll bar, are angled forward to provide anti-dive. The car also uses unequal-length control arms at the rear with the difference being that the twin set of spring-damper units are mounted  inboard of the rear wheels. Each unit is actuated by a bell crank from a linkage that attaches to the lower end of the hub carrier. The brakes have drilled and slotted rotors all around and use twin-pot calipers developed by Brembo. The wheels have race-style hubs that have five locating pegs and a large central nut to secure the wheel. The five-spoke, two-piece, cast­-aluminum OZ Racing wheels are clad in 245/40ZR-17 Pirelli P Zero tyres up front and 335/35ZR-17s at the rear.

Design 

The chassis was formed of chrome-moly elliptical steel tubing, wrapped in a sleek body designed by Marcello Gandini, who had previously designed the Lamborghini Countach and some aerodynamic Maseratis, and Claudio Zampolli. The front nose shape of the V16T is from an original design for the Lamborghini Diablo by Marcello Gandini. Gandini initially wanted to realise the original design he intended for the Diablo but Zampolli was unimpressed by the design and as a result, only the front of the car has the said design with the rear having design changes made by Zampolli himself. In a notable design choice, the V16T is the only car to be equipped with four pop-up headlights, two stacked vertically on either side, while the rear lights are borrowed from the Alpine A610.

Performance and production 

Only one prototype bearing the Cizeta-Moroder name was manufactured before the partnership dissolved. The car which was finished in a pearl white exterior colour with a red leather interior remained in the possession of Moroder and underwent a full restoration by Canepa design in 2018, after which it was auctioned in January 2022.

In 1991, the list price for a Cizeta was an estimated (US dollars) $650,000. Although predictions for production foresaw one car per month, only 12 examples (including one prototype) were actually built from 1991 until the company moved its operation to Los Angeles, California in 1995. The financial slowdown in the mid 1990s coupled with the car's failure to comply with the US safety regulations and the high asking price restricted production only on a made to order basis. Subsequently, two more cars were completed (one coupé and one spyder) in 1999 and 2003. The car made in 2003 was a convertible variant of the V16T called the Cizeta Fenice TTJ Spyder completed on a special request from a Japanese customer.

As of May 1, 2006, the car was still in production on a made-to-order basis, although now priced at $650,000, or $850,000 for the Spyder TTJ, exclusive of shipping, taxes, and extras. According to a 2018 interview, Zampolli considered the car still theoretically in production and available to purchase as late as 2018, although none had been built since the 2003 spyder.

As of January 2023, the Cizeta Automobile website is active. An "Order" page is listed with specifications of the Moroder V16T with an MSRP of $800,000 and fields for customers to leave their contact details.

Controversy

Moroder's involvement
At some point after the car's debut, Giorgio Moroder and Claudio Zampolli parted ways over a dispute on slow production of the car due its production process which required a large amount of labour hours to complete, materials for the body panels as well as the use of the powerplant. Moroder wanted the car to have a body work constructed from fibre glass and devised the use of a BMW powerplant in place of the bespoke V16 unit installed in the car in order to speed up the production process which initiated the split as these suggestions contradicted with Zampolli's vision for the car. It is known that Claudio Zampolli designed the logo for the car, and Giorgio Moroder paid for the art development. The Cizeta, from 1990 to date, is no longer associated with Moroder; its name remains symbolic of Moroder's hi-tech music and glamorous lifestyle. In addition, while the car debuted (temporarily) as the Cizeta-Moroder, all customer cars were badged simply as Cizeta V16T.

References

External links

Official Cizeta Automobili website

Rear mid-engine, rear-wheel-drive vehicles
Coupés
Cars of Italy
1990s cars
Cars introduced in 1988
First car made by manufacturer
Cars discontinued in 2003